Cody Harris (born 10 October 1985) is a former New Zealand darts player.

Career
Harris comes from a family of dartplayers. His father ran the ACDC Dart Club and Harris watched as a child his parents and other family members when they played. When Eric Bristow came to New Zealand for the WDF World Cup, Harris' father played against him and won. When Harris was around eight years old he for the first time threw a dart.

When Harris was nine he won the A grade Championship for the Auckland Darts Association and he for the first time took part in the national championship when he was 13. Many national successes followed including the win in the 2015 Sydney Darts Masters Qualifier and the National Championship 2015. Internationally, his biggest success so far was the last 32 of the Winmau World Masters in 2015 where he lost to Scott Waites 3–0.

In 2016, he represented New Zealand together along with Warren Parry in the PDC World Cup of Darts. They played Scotland (consisting of Gary Anderson and Robert Thornton), and after breaking the throw with a 125 checkout, he and Parry led 3–1, before Scotland won four legs in a row to win 5–3. At the 2017 event, Harris and Rob Szabo were eliminated 5–2 by Belgium in the opening round.

Harris entered the 2018 PDC Q-School.

World Championship results

PDC
 2018: 1st Round (lost to Ian White 1–3)
 2019: 2nd Round (lost to Jamie Lewis 2–3)

Performance timeline
PDC

References

External links
Cody Harris at Darts Database

New Zealand darts players
Living people
Professional Darts Corporation associate players
1985 births
PDC World Cup of Darts team New Zealand